Željko "Struja" Lukajić (born December 14, 1958) is a Serbian professional basketball coach.

Coaching career
Lukajić began coaching in 1986 when he was the head coach of KK Famos Hrasnica for the 1986–1987 season. Over two decades he worked with Bosnian and Serbian clubs, including Partizan Belgrade in 1993–94 season and Hemofarm Vršac from 1998 until 2005.

In January 2010, he became the head coach of his former team Hemofarm Vršac. He parted ways with the team in January 2012. 

Month later, he took the coaching position in the Ukrainian team Politekhnika-Halychyna. He stayed there for one and a half season.

On November 26, 2014, he returned to Igokea to be the team's new head coach; he already had short stint coaching Igokea in 2007.

On December 8, 2017, he became a head coach of Macedonian basketball team MZT Skopje. He left MZT on April 3, 2018.

See also
 List of ABA League-winning coaches

References

External links
 Željko Lukajić at eurobasket.com
 Željko Lukajić at euroleague.net

1958 births
Living people
ABA League-winning coaches
Bosnia and Herzegovina basketball coaches
Bosnia and Herzegovina expatriate basketball people in Serbia
People from Goražde
KK Borovica coaches
KK Partizan coaches
KK Vojvodina coaches
KK Igokea coaches
KK Hemofarm coaches
OKK Kikinda coaches
P.A.O.K. BC coaches
Serbian expatriate basketball people in Greece
Serbian expatriate basketball people in Bulgaria
Serbian expatriate basketball people in Ukraine
Serbian expatriate basketball people in Russia
Serbian expatriate basketball people in North Macedonia
Serbs of Bosnia and Herzegovina
Serbian men's basketball coaches